Nasi gurih is an Indonesian steamed rice cooked in coconut milk and spices dish originally from Aceh, Indonesia.

Etymology
Nasi gurih literally means "succulent rice" in Aceh language and Indonesian. The name describes the rich taste of rice cooked with coconut milk and spices.

Preparation
Nasi gurih is made by cooking mixture of rice and sticky rice soaked in coconut milk instead of water, along with salt, lemongrass, Indian bay leaf, and pandan leaves to add aroma.

Side dishes
Nasi gurih sold in Acehnese warung or other eating establishments are commonly offered with assortment of side dishes, chosen according to client's desire. Basic ingredient sprinkled upon nasi gurih are fried peanuts, bawang goreng (fried shallot), tauco (soybean paste), sambal and krupuk. Side dishes are ikan balado (fish in chili), udang sambal (shrimp in chili), ayam goreng, dendeng (beef jerky) and perkedel (fried mashed potato patty).

Variants
There are similar dishes in other parts of Indonesia called nasi uduk from Jakarta and nasi lemak, commonly found in Riau and Riau islands (Sumatera), also Malaysia, Brunei and Singapore.

See also

Nasi uduk
Nasi bogana
Nasi campur
Nasi goreng
Nasi kebuli
Nasi kucing
Nasi kuning
Nasi lemak
Nasi liwet
Nasi pecel
Nasi ulam

References

External links
 Aceh nasi gurih recipe

Acehnese cuisine
Indonesian rice dishes
Foods containing coconut